Hugo Zukal (1845–1900) was an Austrian lichenologist and mycologist. Born in Troppau (now Opava in the Czech Republic), he graduated from high school there in 1859, and was afterwards employed as a botanist until 1864. From 1864 until 1872, he served in the Kaiserlich-Königlich army. After this, he attended the teacher training college in Trautenau (now Trutnov), and became a teacher in Freudental and Vienna. In 1898 he became a professor of phytopathology at the University of Natural Resources and Life Sciences, Vienna. He died in Vienna in 1900.

Several taxa have been named to honour Zukal. These include the genera Zukalia , Zukalina , and the species Ascophanus zukalii , Cryptocoryne zukalii , Gloeopeziza zukalii , Humaria zukalii , Leucoloma zukalii , Penicillium zukalii , and Thelebolus zukalii .

Selected publications

See also
 :Category:Taxa named by Hugo Zukal

References

1845 births
1900 deaths
Austrian lichenologists
Austrian mycologists
University of Natural Resources and Life Sciences, Vienna
People from Opava